The 1978–79 Hong Kong First Division League season was the 68th since its establishment.

League table

References
1978–79 Hong Kong First Division table (RSSSF)

Hong
Hong Kong First Division League seasons
1